Ansan is a city in Gyeonggi Province, South Korea.

Ansan may also refer to:

Places
 Ansan (Gangwon), a mountain in Gangwon Province, South Korea
 Ansan, Gers, a commune of the Gers département, France
 Ansan (Seoul), a mountain in Seoul, South Korea

Other uses
 Ansan (karate), a kata
 An San, a South Korean archer

See also
 Anshan (disambiguation)
 Ansen
 Anson (disambiguation)